MSTA may refer to:

 2S19 Msta, a Russian self-propelled howitzer
 The Msta River, a river in Russia
 The Moorish Science Temple of America, an American religious organization